"Alec Eiffel" is a song by the American alternative rock band Pixies, from their 1991 album Trompe le Monde. The song was written and sung by frontman Black Francis, produced by Gil Norton and recorded during the album's recording sessions. "Alec Eiffel" was released as a single in France, the United Kingdom and the United States, and was their third single from the album.

Composition
The song references the French engineer Alexandre Gustave Eiffel, who designed the Eiffel Tower and the Statue of Liberty; Francis thought it was a "fascinating subject" to compose a song about. Francis also mentioned another meaning of the song: "Because of Alexandre Gustave Eiffel, but also because it's funny: in Australia, you often say 'It's a smart Alec' for  a guy who's nice but not very bright."

Australians generally use the word to describe someone who is speaking out of turn, often in a way that makes them appear more intelligent than the person or group they are addressing. In Britain and the United States, a "smart Alec" is the exact opposite of Francis' description: someone who is intelligent, but mean or sarcastic.

Video
The song's video features the band playing in a wind-tunnel, a reference to the "pioneer of aerodynamics", with physics formulae in the background.

Critical reception
The British magazine Melody Maker later commented on Francis' songwriting technique and the song itself: "According to Charles, the song started with Eiffel, then he started to [sic] singing the words "Eiffel, rifle, trifle", and suddenly 'everything fell into place'. It's not certain whether lines like 'little Eiffel stands in the archway, even though it doesn't make no sense' are an observation of the lunacy of the architecture or the song itself, which features a Sixties' -style zither!" (Francis is actually singing "keeping low, it don't make no sense", rather than "even though" which answers Melody Maker's question.)

Track listing

Cover versions
 An April March's cover was included on the 1999 tribute album Pixies Fuckin' Die! (a tribute).
 A cover by the Get Up Kids was included on the 1999 tribute album Where Is My Mind? a tribute to The Pixies, and later released on their Eudora album in 2001.
 Cameron Brown's cover was released on the 2003 tribute album hey: A Pixies Tribute.

References

Songs about occupations
Songs about Paris
1991 singles
Pixies (band) songs
Songs written by Black Francis
Elektra Records singles
1991 songs
Song recordings produced by Gil Norton